Kumari was the first Eastman color Nepali film released in 1977. The movie was made on the story of the popular author Bijaya Bahadur Malla. Prem Bahadur Basnet wrote the script of the movie and Pradeep Rimal wrote the dialogues. The subject of the movie is based up on indigenous Newar community.

References

External links 

Nepalese drama films
Films based on Nepalese novels
1977 films